Narasimha Chary, popularly known by his screen name Sampoornesh Babu, is an Indian actor known for his works in the spoof comedy genre in Telugu cinema. He made his acting debut as the lead role in the 2014 film, Hrudaya Kaleyam, for which he won the CineMAA Award for Best Actor in a Comic Role. He was a contestant in Bigg Boss Telugu.

Acting career 
He appeared in cameo roles in many movies, including Current Theega (2014) as Sunny Leone's fiancé, and Allari Naresh's Bandipotu (2015). His next full time stint was in film Singam 123 (2015), a parody of Suriya's Singam film series which are known their action sequences.

In 2019, he played three roles in Kobbari Matta (2019). Later that year, he shot for Takkari Donga Chalaki Chukka but the film remains unreleased. In 2020, he announced his film ? which he promoted as the last film to be shot in Wuhan before the COVID-19 pandemic.

Filmography

Film

Television

References

External links
 
 సినీ నటుడు సంపూర్ణేష్ బాబు కారును ఢీకొన్న ఆర్టీసీ బస్సు.. భార్య పిల్లలకు గాయాలు

Living people
Telugu comedians
People from Medak district
Male actors from Telangana
Male actors in Telugu cinema
Indian male film actors
21st-century Indian male actors
Year of birth missing (living people)
Indian male comedians